Arthur Edward Engstrom (August 23, 1898 – April 10, 1953) was an American football guard who played one season in the National Football League (NFL) for the Duluth Kelleys. He played college football for Chicago.

Engstrom was born on August 23, 1898, in Duluth, Minnesota. He attended Valparaiso High School in Indiana, before playing college football for Chicago.

He appeared in two games. The first was an exhibition tie against the Ironwood Legion, in which he was starting left guard. He also started in the first game of the regular season, a 6–3 win over the Green Bay Packers. He did not play for the rest of the season, and was not on a team in the next year, finishing his career with just one game at the professional level.

He died on April 10, 1953, in Duluth, at the age of 54.

References

External links

1898 births
1953 deaths
Players of American football from Minnesota
Sportspeople from Duluth, Minnesota
American football guards
Chicago Maroons football players
Duluth Kelleys players